List of primates contains the extant species in the order Primates and currently contains 16 families and 72 genera. For extinct species see the list of fossil primates.

Suborder Strepsirrhini

Infraorder Lemuriformes

Superfamily Lemuroidea

 Family Cheirogaleidae: dwarf and mouse lemurs
 Genus Cheirogaleus
 Montagne d'Ambre dwarf lemur, Cheirogaleus andysabini
 Furry-eared dwarf lemur, Cheirogaleus crossleyi
 Groves' dwarf lemur, Cheirogaleus grovesi
 Lavasoa dwarf lemur, Cheirogaleus lavasoensis
 Greater dwarf lemur, Cheirogaleus major
 Fat-tailed dwarf lemur, Cheirogaleus medius
 Lesser iron-gray dwarf lemur, Cheirogaleus minusculus
 Ankarana dwarf lemur, Cheirogaleus shethi
 Sibree's dwarf lemur, Cheirogaleus sibreei
 Thomas' dwarf lemur, Cheirogaleus thomasi
 Genus Microcebus
 Arnhold's mouse lemur (Microcebus arnholdi)
 Madame Berthe's mouse lemur (Microcebus berthae)
 Bongolava mouse lemur (Microcebus bongolavensis)
 Boraha mouse lemur (Microcebus boraha)
 Danfoss' mouse lemur (Microcebus danfossi)
 Ganzhorn's mouse lemur (Microcebus ganzhorni)
 Gerp's mouse lemur (Microcebus gerpi)
 Reddish-gray mouse lemur (Microcebus griseorufus)
 Jolly's mouse lemur (Microcebus jollyae)
 Jonah's mouse lemur, (Microcebus jonahi)
 Goodman's mouse lemur (Microcebus lehilahytsara)
 MacArthur's mouse lemur (Microcebus macarthurii)
 Claire's mouse lemur (Microcebus mamiratra)
 Bemanasy mouse lemur, (Microcebus manitatra)
 Margot Marsh's mouse lemur (Microcebus margotmarshae)
 Marohita mouse lemur (Microcebus marohita)
 Mittermeier's mouse lemur (Microcebus mittermeieri)
 Gray mouse lemur (Microcebus murinus)
 Pygmy mouse lemur (Microcebus myoxinus)
 Golden-brown mouse lemur (Microcebus ravelobensis)
 Brown mouse lemur (Microcebus rufus)
 Sambirano mouse lemur (Microcebus sambiranensis)
 Simmons' mouse lemur (Microcebus simmonsi)
 Anosy mouse lemur (Microcebus tanosi)
 Northern rufous mouse lemur (Microcebus tavaratra)
 Genus Mirza
 Coquerel's giant mouse lemur or Coquerel's mouse lemur (Mirza coquereli)
 Northern giant mouse lemur (Mirza zaza)
 Genus Allocebus
 Hairy-eared dwarf lemur (Allocebus trichotis)
 Genus Phaner
 Amber Mountain fork-marked lemur (Phaner electromontis)
 Masoala fork-marked lemur (Phaner furcifer)
 Pale fork-marked lemur (Phaner pallescens)
 Pariente's fork-marked lemur (Phaner parienti)
 Family Lemuridae: lemurs
 Genus Lemur
 Ring-tailed lemur (Lemur catta)
 Genus Eulemur : true lemurs
 White-headed lemur (Eulemur albifrons)
 Gray-headed lemur (Eulemur cinereiceps)
 Collared brown lemur (Eulemur collaris)
 Crowned lemur (Eulemur coronatus)
 Blue-eyed black lemur (Eulemur flavifrons)
 Common brown lemur (Eulemur fulvus)
 Black lemur (Eulemur macaco)
 Mongoose lemur (Eulemur mongoz)
 Red-bellied lemur (Eulemur rubriventer)
 Red-fronted lemur (Eulemur rufifrons)
 Red lemur (Eulemur rufus)
 Sanford's brown lemur (Eulemur sanfordi)
 Genus Hapalemur : lesser gentle or bamboo lemurs
 Lac Alaotra bamboo lemur (Hapalemur alaotrensis)
 Golden bamboo lemur (Hapalemur aureus)
 Eastern lesser bamboo lemur (Hapalemur griseus)
 Southern lesser bamboo lemur (Hapalemur meridionalis)
 Western lesser bamboo lemur (Hapalemur occidentalis)
 Genus Prolemur
 Greater bamboo lemur (Prolemur simus)
 Genus Varecia : ruffed lemurs
 Red ruffed lemur (Varecia rubra)
 Black-and-white ruffed lemur (Varecia variegata)
 Family Lepilemuridae: sportive lemurs
 Genus Lepilemur
 AEECL's sportive lemur (Lepilemur aeeclis)
 Ahmanson's sportive lemur (Lepilemur ahmansoni)
 Ankarana sportive lemur (Lepilemur ankaranensis)
 Betsileo sportive lemur (Lepilemur betsileo)
 Gray-backed sportive lemur (Lepilemur dorsalis)
 Milne-Edwards' sportive lemur (Lepilemur edwardsi)
 Fleurete's sportive lemur (Lepilemur fleuretae)
 Grewcock's sportive lemur (Lepilemur grewcockorum)
 Holland's sportive lemur (Lepilemur hollandorum)
 Hubbard's sportive lemur (Lepilemur hubbardi)
 James' sportive lemur (Lepilemur jamesorum)
 White-footed sportive lemur (Lepilemur leucopus)
 Small-toothed sportive lemur (Lepilemur microdon)
 Daraina sportive lemur (Lepilemur milanoii)
 Mittermeier's sportive lemur (Lepilemur mittermeieri)
 Weasel sportive lemur (Lepilemur mustelinus)
 Otto's sportive lemur (Lepilemur otto)
 Petter's sportive lemur (Lepilemur petteri) 
 Randrianasolo's sportive lemur (Lepilemur randrianasoli)
 Red-tailed sportive lemur (Lepilemur ruficaudatus)
 Sahamalaza sportive lemur (Lepilemur sahamalazensis)
 Scott's sportive lemur (Lepilemur scottorum)
 Seal's sportive lemur (Lepilemur seali)
 Northern sportive lemur (Lepilemur septentrionalis)
 Hawks' sportive lemur (Lepilemur tymerlachsoni)
 Wright's sportive lemur (Lepilemur wrightae)
 Family Indriidae: woolly lemurs and allies
 Genus Indri
 Indri (Indri indri)
 Genus Avahi
 Betsileo woolly lemur (Avahi betsileo)
 Bemaraha woolly lemur (Avahi cleesei)
 Eastern woolly lemur (Avahi laniger)
 Southern woolly lemur (Avahi meridionalis)
 Moore's woolly lemur (Avahi mooreorum)
 Western woolly lemur (Avahi occidentalis)
 Peyrieras's woolly lemur (Avahi peyrierasi)
 Ramanantsoavana's woolly lemur (Avahi ramanantsoavani)
 Sambirano woolly lemur (Avahi unicolor)
 Genus Propithecus
 Silky sifaka (Propithecus candidus)
 Coquerel's sifaka (Propithecus coquereli) 
 Crowned sifaka (Propithecus coronatus)
 Von der Decken's sifaka (Propithecus deckenii)
 Diademed sifaka (Propithecus diadema) 
 Milne-Edwards's sifaka (Propithecus edwardsi) 
 Perrier's sifaka (Propithecus perrieri) 
 Golden-crowned sifaka (Propithecus tattersalli) 
 Verreaux's sifaka (Propithecus verreauxi)
 Family Daubentoniidae: aye-aye
 Genus Daubentonia
 Aye-aye (Daubentonia madagascariensis)

Superfamily Lorisoidea
 Family Lorisidae: lorises, pottos and allies
 Genus Arctocebus
 Golden angwantibo (Arctocebus aureus)
 Calabar angwantibo (Arctocebus calabarensis)
 Genus Perodicticus
 Central African potto (Perodicticus edwardsi)
East African potto (Perodicticus ibeanus)
West African potto (Perodicticus potto)
 Genus Loris
 Gray slender loris (Loris lydekkerianus)
 Red slender loris (Loris tardigradus)
 Genus Nycticebus
 Bangka slow loris (Nycticebus bancanus)
 Bengal slow loris (Nycticebus bengalensis)
 Bornean slow loris (Nycticebus borneanus)
 Sunda slow loris (Nycticebus coucang)
 Javan slow loris (Nycticebus javanicus)
 Kayan River slow loris (Nycticebus kayan)
 Philippine slow loris (Nycticebus menagensis)
 Sumatran slow loris (Nycticebus hilleri)
 Genus Xanthonycticebus
 Pygmy slow loris (Xanthonycticebus pygmaeus)
 Family Galagidae: galagos
 Genus Galago
 Somali bushbaby (Galago gallarum)
 Dusky bushbaby (Galago matschiei)
 Mohol bushbaby (Galago moholi)
 Senegal bushbaby (Galago senegalensis)
 Genus Galagoides
 Prince Demidoff's bushbaby (Galagoides demidovii)
 Angolan dwarf galago (Galagoides kumbirensis)
 Thomas's bushbaby (Galagoides thomasi)
 Genus Paragalago
 Kenya coast galago (Paragalago cocos)
 Grant's bushbaby (Paragalago granti)
 Malawi bushbaby (Paragalago nyasae)
 Uluguru bushbaby (Paragalago orinus)
 Rondo dwarf galago (Paragalago rondoensis)
 Thomas's bushbaby (Paragalago thomasi)
 Zanzibar bushbaby (Paragalago zanzibaricus)
 Rungwe dwarf galago (Paragalago sp. nov.)
 Genus Otolemur
 Brown greater galago (Otolemur crassicaudatus)
 Northern greater galago (Otolemur garnettii)
 Silvery greater galago (Otolemur monteiri)
 Genus Euoticus
 Southern needle-clawed bushbaby (Euoticus elegantulus)
 Northern needle-clawed bushbaby (Euoticus pallidus)
 Genus Sciurocheirus
 Bioko Allen's bushbaby (Sciurocheirus alleni)
 Cross River bushbaby (Sciurocheirus cameronensis)
 Gabon bushbaby (Sciurocheirus gabonensis)
 Makandé squirrel galago (Sciurocheirus makandensis)

Suborder Haplorrhini

Infraorder Tarsiiformes

Family Tarsiidae: tarsiers
 Genus Carlito
 Philippine tarsier (Carlito syrichta)

 Genus Cephalopachus
 Horsfield's tarsier (Cephalopachus bancanus)
 Genus Tarsius
 Dian's tarsier (Tarsius dentatus)
 Makassar tarsier (Tarsius fuscus)
 Lariang tarsier (Tarsius lariang)
 Peleng tarsier (Tarsius pelengensis)
 Pygmy tarsier (Tarsius pumilus)
 Sangihe tarsier (Tarsius sangirensis)
 Spectral tarsier (Tarsius tarsier)
 Siau Island tarsier (Tarsius tumpara)
 Wallace's tarsier (Tarsius wallacei)
 Gursky's spectral tarsier, (Tarsius spectrumgurskyae)
 Jatna's tarsier, (Tarsius supriatnai)
 Niemitz's tarsier (Tarsius niemitzi)

Infraorder Simiiformes

Parvorder Platyrrhini
thumb|right|199px|Callithrix jacchus

 Family Callitrichidae: marmosets and tamarins
 Genus Callithrix
 Buffy-tufted marmoset (Callithrix aurita)
 Buffy-headed marmoset (Callithrix flaviceps)
 White-headed marmoset (Callithrix geoffroyi)
 Common marmoset (Callithrix jacchus) 
 Wied's marmoset (Callithrix kuhlii)
 Black-tufted marmoset (Callithrix penicillata)
 Genus Mico
 Rio Acari marmoset (Mico acariensis)
 Silvery marmoset (Mico argentatus)
 Gold-and-white marmoset (Mico chrysoleuca)
 Emilia's marmoset (Mico emiliae)
 Santarem marmoset (Mico humeralifera
 Roosmalens' dwarf marmoset (Mico humilis)
 Hershkovitz's marmoset (Mico intermedia)
 White marmoset (Mico leucippe)
 Black-headed marmoset (Mico nigriceps)
 Manicore marmoset (Mico manicorensis)
 Marca's marmoset (Mico marcai)
 Maués marmoset (Mico mauesi)
 Black-tailed marmoset (Mico melanura)
 Rondon's marmoset (Mico rondoni)
 Satéré marmoset (Mico saterei)
 Schneider's marmoset (Mico schneideri)
 Genus Cebuella
 Eastern pygmy marmoset (Cebuella niveiventris)
 Western pygmy marmoset (Cebuella pygmaea)
Genus Leontocebus: saddle-back tamarins
 Cruz Lima's saddle-back tamarin, (Leontocebus cruzlimai)
 Brown-mantled tamarin (Leontocebus fuscicollis)
 Lesson's saddle-back tamarin, (Leontocebus fuscus)
 Illiger's saddle-back tamarin, (Leontocebus illigeri)
 Red-mantled saddle-back tamarin, (Leontocebus lagonotus)
 Andean saddle-back tamarin, (Leontocebus leucogenys)
 Black-mantled tamarin (Leontocebus nigricollis)
 Geoffroy's saddle-back tamarin, (Leontocebus nigrifrons)
 Golden-mantled tamarin (Leontocebus tripartitus)
 Weddell's saddle-back tamarin, (Leontocebus weddelli)
 Genus Leontopithecus: lion tamarins
 Superagui lion tamarin (Leontopithecus caissara)
 Golden-headed lion tamarin (Leontopithecus chrysomelas)
 Black lion tamarin (Leontopithecus chrysopygus)
 Golden lion tamarin (Leontopithecus rosalia)
 Genus Saguinus
 Pied tamarin (Saguinus bicolor)
 Geoffroy's tamarin (Saguinus geoffroyi)
 Emperor tamarin (Saguinus imperator)
 Mottle-faced tamarin (Saguinus inustus)
 White-lipped tamarin (Saguinus labiatus)
 White-footed tamarin (Saguinus leucopus)
 Martins's tamarin (Saguinus martinsi)
 Red-handed tamarin (Saguinus midas)
 Moustached tamarin (Saguinus mystax)
 Black tamarin (Saguinus niger)
 Cotton-top tamarin or Pinché tamarin (Saguinus oedipus)
 Red-capped tamarin (Saguinus pileatus)
 Eastern black-handed tamarin (Saguinus ursulus)
 Genus Callimico
 Goeldi's marmoset (Callimico goeldii)
 Family Cebidae: capuchins and squirrel monkeys
 Genus Cebus: gracile capuchins
 Ecuadorian white-fronted capuchin (Cebus aequatorialis)
 Humboldt's white-fronted capuchin (Cebus albifrons)
 Venezuelan brown capuchin (Cebus brunneus)
 Colombian white-faced capuchin  (Cebus capucinus)
 Chestnut capuchin (Cebus castaneus)
 Río Cesar white-fronted capuchin (Cebus cesare)
 Shock-headed capuchin (Cebus cuscinus)
 Panamanian white-faced capuchin (Cebus imitator)
 Ka'apor capuchin (Cebus kaapori)
 Sierra de Perijá white-fronted capuchin (Cebus leucocephalus)
 Santa Marta white-fronted capuchin (Cebus malitiosus)
 Guianan weeper capuchin (Cebus olivaceus)
 Spix's white-fronted capuchin  (Cebus unicolor)
 Varied white-fronted capuchin (Cebus versicolor)
 Marañón white-fronted capuchin (Cebus yuracus)
 Genus Sapajus: robust (tufted) capuchins
 Tufted capuchin (Sapajus apella)
 Azaras's capuchin (Sapajus cay)
 Blond capuchin (Sapajus flavius)
 Black-striped capuchin (Sapajus libidinosus)
 Black capuchin (Sapajus nigritus)
 Crested capuchin (Sapajus robustus)
 Golden-bellied capuchin (Sapajus xanthosternos)
 Genus Saimiri: squirrel monkeys
 Black-capped squirrel monkey (Saimiri boliviensis)
 Humboldt's squirrel monkey (Saimiri cassiquiarensis)
 Collins' squirrel monkey (Saimiri collinsi)
 Central American squirrel monkey (Saimiri oerstedii)
 Guianan squirrel monkey (Saimiri sciureus)
 Bare-eared squirrel monkey (Saimiri ustus)
 Black squirrel monkey (Saimiri vanzolinii)
 Family Aotidae: night or owl monkeys or douroucoulis
 Genus Aotus
 Azara's night monkey (Aotus azarae)
 Brumback's night monkey (Aotus brumbacki)
 Gray-handed night monkey (Aotus griseimembra)
 Hernández-Camacho's night monkey (Aotus jorgehernandezi)
 Gray-bellied night monkey (Aotus lemurinus)
 Peruvian night monkey (Aotus miconax)
 Nancy Ma's night monkey (Aotus nancymae) 
 Black-headed night monkey (Aotus nigriceps)
 Three-striped night monkey (Aotus trivirgatus)
 Spix's night monkey (Aotus vociferans)
 Panamanian night monkey (Aotus zonalis)
 Family Pitheciidae: titis, sakis and uakaris
 Subfamily Callicebinae
 Genus Plecturocebus
 White-eared titi, Plecturocebus donacophilus
 Rio Beni titi, Plecturocebus modestus
 Rio Mayo titi, Plecturocebus oenanthe
 Ollala brothers's titi, Plecturocebus olallae
 White-coated titi, Plecturocebus pallescens
 Urubamba brown titi, Plecturocebus urubambensis
 Baptista Lake titi, Plecturocebus baptista
 Prince Bernhard's titi, Plecturocebus bernhardi
 Brown titi, Plecturocebus brunneus
 Ashy black titi, Plecturocebus cinerascens
 Parecis titi, Plecturocebus parecis
 Hoffmanns's titi, Plecturocebus hoffmannsi
 Alta Floresta titi, Plecturocebus grovesi
 Milton's titi, Plecturocebus miltoni
 Red-bellied titi, Plecturocebus moloch
 Vieira's titi, Plecturocebus vieirai
 Toppin's titi, Plecturocebus toppini
 Madidi titi, Plecturocebus aureipalatii
 Chestnut-bellied titi, Plecturocebus caligatus
 Caquetá titi, Plecturocebus caquetensis
 Coppery titi, Plecturocebus cupreus
 White-tailed titi, Plecturocebus discolor
 Hershkovitz's titi, Plecturocebus dubius
 Ornate titi, Plecturocebus ornatus
 Stephen Nash's titi, Plecturocebus stephennashi
 Genus Cheracebus
 Lucifer titi, Cheracebus lucifer
 Black titi, Cheracebus lugens
 Colombian black-handed titi, Cheracebus medemi
 Red-headed titi, Cheracebus regulus
 Collared titi, Cheracebus torquatus
 Genus Callicebus
 Barbara Brown's titi, Callicebus barbarabrownae
 Coimbra Filho's titi, Callicebus coimbrai
 Coastal black-handed titi, Callicebus melanochir
 Black-fronted titi, Callicebus nigrifrons
 Atlantic titi, Callicebus personatus
 Subfamily Pitheciinae
 Genus Pithecia
 Equatorial saki, Pithecia aequatorialis 
 White-footed saki, Pithecia albicans 
 Cazuza's saki, Pithecia cazuzai 
 Golden-faced saki, Pithecia chrysocephala 
 Hairy saki, Pithecia hirsuta 
 Burnished saki, Pithecia inusta 
 Rio Tapajós saki, Pithecia irrorata 
 Isabel's saki, Pithecia isabela 
 Monk saki, Pithecia monachus 
 Miller's saki, Pithecia milleri 
 Mittermeier's Tapajós saki, Pithecia mittermeieri 
 Napo saki, Pithecia napensis 
Pissinatti’s saki, Pithecia pissinattii
 White-faced saki, Pithecia pithecia
 Rylands' bald-faced saki, Pithecia rylandsi 
 Vanzolini's bald-faced saki, Pithecia vanzolinii 
 Genus Chiropotes
 White-nosed saki (Chiropotes albinasus)
 Red-backed bearded saki (Chiropotes chiropotes)
 Brown-backed bearded saki (Chiropotes israelita)
 Black bearded saki (Chiropotes satanas)
 Uta Hick's bearded saki (Chiropotes utahickae)
 Genus Cacajao
 Aracá uakari (Cacajao ayresii)
 Bald uakari (Cacajao calvus)
 Neblina uakari (Cacajao hosomi)
 Golden-backed uakari (Cacajao melanocephalus)
 Family Atelidae: howler, spider and woolly monkeys
 Subfamily Alouattinae
 Genus Alouatta
 Ursine howler (Alouatta arctoidea)
 Red-handed howler (Alouatta belzebul)
 Black howler (Alouatta caraya)
 Coiba Island howler (Alouatta coibensis)
 Spix's red-handed howler (Alouatta discolor)
 Brown howler (Alouatta guariba)
 Juruá red howler (Alouatta juara)
 Guyanan red howler (Alouatta macconnelli)
 Amazon black howler (Alouatta nigerrima)
 Mantled howler (Alouatta palliata)
 Guatemalan black howler (Alouatta pigra)
 Purus red howler (Alouatta puruensis)
 Bolivian red howler (Alouatta sara)
 Venezuelan red howler (Alouatta seniculus)
 Maranhão red-handed howler (Alouatta ululata)
 Subfamily Atelinae
 Genus Ateles
 White-bellied spider monkey (Ateles belzebuth)
 Peruvian spider monkey (Ateles chamek)
 Black-headed spider monkey (Ateles fusciceps)
 Geoffroy's spider monkey (Ateles geoffroyi)
 Brown spider monkey (Ateles hybridus)
 White-cheeked spider monkey (Ateles marginatus)
 Red-faced spider monkey (Ateles paniscus)
 Genus Brachyteles
 Southern muriqui (Brachyteles arachnoides)
 Northern muriqui (Brachyteles hypoxanthus)
 Genus Lagothrix
 Brown woolly monkey (Lagothrix lagotricha)
 Yellow-tailed woolly monkey (Lagothrix flavicauda)

Parvorder Catarrhini

 

 Superfamily Cercopithecoidea
 Family Cercopithecidae: Old World monkeys
 Subfamily Cercopithecinae
 Tribe Cercopithecini
 Genus Allenopithecus
 Allen's swamp monkey (Allenopithecus nigroviridis)
 Genus Miopithecus
 Gabon talapoin (Miopithecus ogouensis)
 Angolan talapoin (Miopithecus talapoin)
 Genus Erythrocebus
 Southern patas monkey (Erythrocebus baumstarki)
Common patas monkey (Erythrocebus patas)
Blue Nile patas monkey (Erythrocebus poliocephalus)
 Genus Chlorocebus
 Grivet (Chlorocebus aethiops)
 Malbrouck (Chlorocebus cynosuros)
 Bale Mountains vervet (Chlorocebus djamdjamensis)
 Dryas monkey or Salongo monkey (Chlorocebus dryas)
 Green monkey (Chlorocebus sabaeus)
 Tantalus monkey (Chlorocebus tantalus)
 Vervet monkey (Chlorocebus pygerythrus)
 Genus Allochrocebus
 L'Hoest's monkey (Allochrocebus lhoesti)
 Preuss's monkey (Allochrocebus preussi)
 Sun-tailed monkey (Allochrocebus solatus)
 Genus Cercopithecus
 Sykes' monkey (Cercopithecus albogularis)
 Red-tailed monkey (Cercopithecus ascanius)
 Campbell's mona monkey (Cercopithecus campbelli)
 Moustached guenon (Cercopithecus cephus)
 Dent's mona monkey (Cercopithecus denti)
 Diana monkey (Cercopithecus diana)
 Silver monkey (Cercopithecus doggetti)
 White-throated guenon (Cercopithecus erythrogaster)
 Red-eared guenon (Cercopithecus erythrotis)
 Hamlyn's monkey or owl-faced monkey (Cercopithecus hamlyni)
 Golden monkey (Cercopithecus kandti)
 Lesula (Cercopithecus lomamiensis)
 Lowe's mona monkey (Cercopithecus lowei)
 Blue monkey (Cercopithecus mitis)
 Mona monkey (Cercopithecus mona)
 De Brazza's monkey (Cercopithecus neglectus)
 Greater spot-nosed monkey (Cercopithecus nictitans)
 Lesser spot-nosed monkey (Cercopithecus petaurista)
 Crested mona monkey (Cercopithecus pogonias)
 Roloway monkey (Cercopithecus roloway)
 Sclater's guenon (Cercopithecus sclateri)
 Wolf's mona monkey (Cercopithecus wolfi)
 Tribe Papionini
 Genus Macaca 
 Stump-tailed macaque (Macaca arctoides)
 Assam macaque (Macaca assamensis)
 Formosan rock macaque (Macaca cyclopis)
 Japanese macaque (Macaca fuscata)
 Crab-eating macaque (Macaca fascicularis)
 Heck's macaque (Macaca hecki)
 Northern pig-tailed macaque (Macaca leonina)
 White-cheeked macaque (Macaca leucogenys)
 Moor macaque (Macaca maura)
 Rhesus macaque (Macaca mulatta)
 Arunachal macaque (Macaca munzala)
 Southern pig-tailed macaque (Macaca nemestrina)
 Celebes crested macaque (Macaca nigra)
 Gorontalo macaque (Macaca nigrescens)
 Booted macaque (Macaca ochreata)
 Pagai Island macaque (Macaca pagensis)
 Bonnet macaque (Macaca radiata)
 Siberut macaque (Macaca siberu)
 Lion-tailed macaque (Macaca silenus)
 Toque macaque (Macaca sinica)
 Barbary macaque (Macaca sylvanus)
 Tibetan macaque (Macaca thibetana)
 Tonkean macaque (Macaca tonkeana)
 Genus Lophocebus
 Grey-cheeked mangabey (Lophocebus albigena)
 Black crested mangabey (Lophocebus aterrimus)
 Johnston's mangabey (Lophocebus johnstoni)
 Opdenbosch's mangabey (Lophocebus opdenboschi)
 Osman Hill's mangabey (Lophocebus osmani)
 Uganda mangabey (Lophocebus ugandae)
 Genus Rungwecebus
 Kipunji (Rungwecebus kipunji)
 Genus Papio
 Olive baboon (Papio anubis)
 Yellow baboon (Papio cynocephalus)
 Hamadryas baboon (Papio hamadryas)
 Guinea baboon (Papio papio)
 Chacma baboon (Papio ursinus)
 Kinda baboon (Papio kindae)
 Genus Theropithecus
 Gelada (Theropithecus gelada)
 Genus Cercocebus
 Agile mangabey (Cercocebus agilis)
 Sooty mangabey (Cercocebus atys)
 Golden-bellied mangabey (Cercocebus chrysogaster)
 Tana River mangabey (Cercocebus galeritus)
 Sanje mangabey (Cercocebus sanjei)
 Collared mangabey (Cercocebus torquatus)
 Genus Mandrillus
 Mandrill (Mandrillus sphinx)
 Drill (Mandrillus leucophaeus)
 Subfamily Colobinae
 Genus Colobus
 Angola colobus (Colobus angolensis)
 Mantled guereza (Colobus guereza)
 King colobus (Colobus polykomos)
 Black colobus (Colobus satanas)
 Ursine colobus (Colobus vellerosus)
 Genus Piliocolobus
 Western red colobus (Piliocolobus badius)
 Bouvier's red colobus (Piliocolobus bouiveri)
 Niger Delta red colobus (Piliocolobus epieni)
 Foa's red colobus (Piliocolobus foai)
 Udzungwa red colobus (Piliocolobus gordonorum)
 Zanzibar red colobus (Piliocolobus kirkii)
 Lang's red colobus (Piliocolobus langi)
 Ulindi River red colobus (Piliocolobus lulindicus)
 Oustalet's red colobus (Piliocolobus oustaleti)
 Lomami red colobus (Piliocolobus parmentieri)
 Pennant's colobus (Piliocolobus pennantii)
 Preuss's red colobus (Piliocolobus preussi)
 Tana River red colobus (Piliocolobus rufomitratus)
 Semliki red colobus (Piliocolobus semlikiensis)
 Ugandan red colobus (Piliocolobus tephrosceles)
 Tshuapa red colobus (Piliocolobus tholloni)
 Miss Waldron's red colobus (Piliocolobus waldronae)
 Genus Procolobus
 Olive colobus (Procolobus verus)
 Genus Semnopithecus
 Kashmir gray langur (Semnopithecus ajax)
 Northern plains gray langur (Semnopithecus entellus)
 Nilgiri langur (Semnopithecus johnii)
 Tarai gray langur (Semnopithecus hector)
 Black-footed gray langur (Semnopithecus hypoleucos)
 Tufted gray langur (Semnopithecus priam)
 Nepal gray langur (Semnopithecus schistaceus)
 Purple-faced langur (Semnopithecus vetulus)
 Genus Trachypithecus
 East Javan langur (Trachypithecus auratus)
 Tenasserim lutung (Trachypithecus barbei)
 Indochinese grey langur (Trachypithecus crepusculus)
 Silvery lutung or silvered leaf monkey (Trachypithecus cristatus)
 Delacour's langur (Trachypithecus delacouri)
 Indochinese black langur (Trachypithecus ebenus)
 François' langur (Trachypithecus francoisi)
 Gee's golden langur (Trachypithecus geei)
 Germain's langur (Trachypithecus germaini)
 Hatinh langur (Trachypithecus hatinhensis)
 Laotian langur (Trachypithecus laotum)
 White-headed langur (Trachypithecus leucocephalus)
 Annamese langur (Trachypithecus margarita)
 West Javan langur (Trachypithecus mauritius)
 Shan State langur (Trachypithecus melamera)
 Dusky leaf monkey (Trachypithecus obscurus)
 Phayre's leaf monkey (Trachypithecus phayrei)
 Capped langur (Trachypithecus pileatus)
 White-headed langur (Trachypithecus poliocephalus)
 Popa langur (Trachypithecus popa)
 Selangor silvered langur (Trachypithecus selangorensis)
 Shortridge's langur (Trachypithecus shortridgei)
 Genus Presbytis
 Black-and-white langur (Presbytis bicolor)
 Miller's langur (Presbytis canicrus)
 Javan surili (Presbytis comata) 
 Sarawak surili (Presbytis chrysomelas)
 Raffles banded langur (Presbytis femoralis)
 White-fronted surili (Presbytis frontata)
 Hose's langur (Presbytis hosei)
 Black-crested Sumatran langur (Presbytis melalophos)
 Mitered langur (Presbytis mitrata)
 Natuna Island surili (Presbytis natunae)
 East Sumatran banded langur (Presbytis percura)
 Mentawai langur or joja (Presbytis potenziani)
 Robinson's banded langur (Presbytis robinsoni)
 Maroon leaf monkey (Presbytis rubicunda)
 Saban grizzled langur (Presbytis sabana)
 White-thighed surili (Presbytis siamensis)
 Siberut langur (Presbytis siberu)
 Black Sumatran langur (Presbytis sumatrana)
 Thomas's langur (Presbytis thomasi)
 Genus Pygathrix
 Gray-shanked douc (Pygathrix cinerea)
 Red-shanked douc (Pygathrix nemaeus)
 Black-shanked douc (Pygathrix nigripes)
 Genus Rhinopithecus
 Tonkin snub-nosed monkey (Rhinopithecus avunculus)
 Black snub-nosed monkey (Rhinopithecus bieti)
 Gray snub-nosed monkey (Rhinopithecus brelichi)
 Golden snub-nosed monkey (Rhinopithecus roxellana) 
 Myanmar snub-nosed monkey (Rhinopithecus strykeri)
 Genus Nasalis
 Proboscis monkey (Nasalis larvatus)
 Genus Simias
 Pig-tailed langur (Simias concolor)
 Superfamily Hominoidea
 Family Hylobatidae: gibbons or lesser apes
 Genus Hylobates
 Western grey gibbon (Hylobates abbotti)
 Agile gibbon (Hylobates agilis)
 Bornean white-bearded gibbon (Hylobates albibarbis)
 Eastern grey gibbon  (Hylobates funereus)
 Kloss's gibbon (Hylobates klossii)
 Lar gibbon (Hylobates lar)
 Silvery gibbon (Hylobates moloch)
 Müller's gibbon (Hylobates muelleri)
 Pileated gibbon (Hylobates pileatus)
 Genus Hoolock
 Western hoolock gibbon (Hoolock hoolock)
 Eastern hoolock gibbon (Hoolock leuconedys)
 Skywalker hoolock gibbon (Hoolock tianxing)
 Genus Symphalangus
 Siamang (Symphalangus syndactylus)
 Genus Nomascus
 Northern buffed-cheeked gibbon (Nomascus annamensis)
 Black crested gibbon (Nomascus concolor)
 Yellow-cheeked gibbon (Nomascus gabriellae)
 Hainan black crested gibbon (Nomascus hainanus)
 Northern white-cheeked gibbon (Nomascus leucogenys)
 Eastern black crested gibbon (Nomascus nasutus)
 Southern white-cheeked gibbon (Nomascus siki)
 Family Hominidae: great apes, including humans
 Subfamily Ponginae
 Genus Pongo
 Bornean orangutan (Pongo pygmaeus)
 Sumatran orangutan (Pongo abelii)
 Tapanuli orangutan (Pongo tapanuliensis)
 Subfamily Homininae 
 Tribe Gorillini
 Genus Gorilla
 Western gorilla (Gorilla gorilla)
 Eastern gorilla (Gorilla beringei) 
 Tribe Hominini
 Genus Pan
 Bonobo or pygmy chimpanzee (Pan paniscus)
 Chimpanzee (Pan troglodytes)
 Genus Homo
 Human (Homo sapiens)

See also 

 List of human evolution fossils
 List of fossil primates
 List of primates of Africa
 Mammal classification
 Primatology

Primates
 Lists